IMG, originally known as the International Management Group, is an American global sports, events and talent management company headquartered in New York City. It has been owned by Endeavor since 2013. Trans World International (TWI) is an event and production company of IMG.

History
IMG was founded in 1960 in Cleveland, Ohio by Mark McCormack, an American lawyer who spotted the potential for athletes to make large incomes from endorsement in the television age; he signed professional golfers Arnold Palmer, Gary Player and Jack Nicklaus as his first clients who collectively are known as The Big Three. McCormack died in 2003. In 2004 Forstmann Little, led by Theodore J. Forstmann, acquired the company; Forstmann served as chairman and CEO until his death in late 2011.

On June 1, 2006, IMG Media acquired Tiger Aspect Productions, the producer of the British television series Mr. Bean and the company, along with Darlow Smithson Productions (also acquired in 2006) later sold to Endemol in November 2009.

In 2006, IMG Media acquired nunet AG, a provider of mobile TV services to mobile network operators around the world. Clients of nunet's mobile TV CMS currently include: Vodafone, Proximus, Vodacom, Mobilkom A1. Content distributed currently includes MTV, Fashion TV, Eurosport, and Discovery Networks.

In November 2007, IMG acquired Kentucky-based Host Communications, which had multiple business units with services ranging from sports marketing and broadcasting to the management of associations and non-profit organizations. The sports-related businesses were combined with the Collegiate Licensing Company (CLC) to form IMG College, while the association management division was renamed IMG Associations.

IMG was originally headquartered in downtown Cleveland in a complex built in 1965 diagonally across the street from Erieview Tower. When the IMG Center was built, it originally housed the Cuyahoga Saving Bank, which was acquired by Charter One Bank in 1998. In 1997, IMG renovated the Cuyahoga Savings Bank Building and renamed it IMG Center. At street level they have a projection screen showing their businesses, events and clients, with images ranging from Formula One racing to professional golfers. Following the acquisition of IMG by Forstmann Little, the headquarters remained in Cleveland, Ohio, for several years until officially relocating to its new parent company's existing offices in New York, in 2010, though the IMG Center is still located on East Ninth Street in Cleveland.

On October 15, 2010, IMG acquired ISP, the multimedia rights holder for more than 50 universities based in Winston-Salem, North Carolina. As a result of the acquisition, IMG College retained ISP's former headquarters in Winston-Salem.

On December 18, 2013, IMG was acquired by William Morris Endeavor and Silver Lake Partners in a $2.4 billion deal. WME’s Ari Emanuel and Patrick Whitesell serve as co-CEOs with IMG and its more than 3,000 employees worldwide continuing as an independent entity.

Media
IMG distributes over 45,000 hours of content—originating from more than 200 clients and events—to major global broadcasters annually, across all forms of media including TV, audio, fixed media, inflight and closed circuit, broadband and mobile. The company’s multimedia product offering includes production of all Channel 4 Racing broadcasts, the inCycle and Golfing World shows, while IMG also produces and distributes Sport 24, the first ever live global premium 24-hour sports channel for the airline and cruise industries, and Edge Sport HD, the 24-hour premium action sports channel. It maintains the world’s largest sports archive with more than 250,000 hours of footage and operates joint ventures with the UEFA Champions League and the Super Cup (clubs) and the Euros (national teams) (UEFA), Premier League (Premier League Productions), European Tour (European Tour Productions), Globo TV Sports (Brazilian League Productions), Associated Press (SNTV) and Asian Tour (Asian Tour Media).

IMG Academy
IMG Academy is a private educational institution located in Bradenton, Florida, and specializing in sports training. The boarding school offers an Academy program for Pre-K/elementary, middle & high school, and postgraduates, as well as a year-round camp program.  The 500-acre campus also serves as the training and competition venue for amateur and professional teams, the host site for a variety of events, and a hub for sports performance research and innovation. Sport programs include: baseball; golf; soccer; tennis; basketball; football; lacrosse; and track & field and cross-country.

IMG Models
IMG Models, a division of IMG Worldwide, is an international model management firm. IMG models has offices in New York City, Los Angeles, London, Milan, Paris, and Sydney. Representing female talent since its inception, as of September 21, 2012, IMG has re-launched its men's division after its dismantling in 2007.

Consulting
Consulting works with many corporations on marketing and sponsorship programs, and IMG's stadium and arena group works with leagues and franchises throughout the world. In Brazil, it operated heavily in the recent years along with local affiliate IMM (former IMX), serving clients involved with the FIFA 2014 World Cup and the Rio 2016 Summer Olympics.

Speakers
Speakers book talent for Fortune 500 companies, associations, healthcare organizations, lecture series and colleges and universities throughout the world.

Joint ventures
IMG operates joint ventures with four major partners in four key emerging markets—Brazil, China, India, and Turkey. IMM (Brazil, former IMX), CC-TV IMG (China), IMG Reliance (India) later Reliance buyout all stake and made it RISE Worldwide and IMG Dogus (Turkey) all work to develop sports, fashion and entertainment properties in their respective territories.

IMG has also partnered with John and Chris Evert to found the Evert Tennis Academy located in Boca Raton, Florida.

In 2015, IMG and Euroleague Basketball agreed on a 10-year joint venture. Together they will manage the commercial operation, and management of all global rights covering both media and marketing of the EuroLeague (the premier competition for European professional men's basketball clubs) and its 2nd-tier competition, the EuroCup.

In May 2017 it was announced that Etihad Airways would collaborate with IMG Models, on a show called Model Diaries, showcasing models in high fashion as they travel to fashion shows around the world.

In July 2017 IMG lost the R&A contract to run the Open Golf Merchandising Shop, as R&A opted to take the operation in house.

IMG events

Association football
 FIFA
 FIFA World Cup (world feed except Fox Sports in the United States)
 FIFA Women's World Cup (world feed except Fox Sports in the United States)
 FIFA Club World Cup (world feed)
 UEFA
UEFA club competitions (world feed except CBS Sports in the United States)
 UEFA Champions League
 UEFA Super Cup
 UEFA Europa League
 UEFA Europa Conference League
 UEFA national team competitions (world feed except Fox Sports in the United States)
UEFA European Championship 
UEFA Nations League
UEFA Women's Championship
 CONMEBOL
 Copa America (world feed)
 CONMEBOL Libertadores (world feed)
 CONMEBOL Libertadores Femenina (world feed)
 CONMEBOL Recopa (world feed)
 CONMEBOL Sudamericana (world feed)
 Premier League (world feed except NBC Sports in the United States)
 FA Cup (world feed)
 FA Women's Super League (world feed)
 EFL Cup (world feed)
 England qualifying and friendly matches (world feed)

Basketball
 FIBA Basketball World Cup (2023)
 EuroLeague
 EuroCup

Bull riding
 Professional Bull Riders

Entertainment
Miss Teen USA (until 26/10/2022)
Miss USA (until 26/10/2022)
Miss Universe (until 26/10/2022)
Taste Festivals
Hyde Park Winter Wonderland

Figure skating
Stars on Ice

Golf
 European Tour
Abu Dhabi HSBC Golf Championship
Alfred Dunhill Links Championship
ANA Inspiration
Arnold Palmer Invitational
Cambia Portland Classic 
The Honda Classic
HSBC Women's Champions
Reingwood LPGA Classic 
Ricoh Women's British Open 
Sime Darby LPGA Malaysia 
Swinging Skirts LPGA Classic 
Thailand Golf Championship
WGC-HSBC Champions
Shinhan Donghae Open

Martial arts
Ultimate Fighting Championship

Motorsports
Formula Drift

Rugby league
 Super League

Running
Run to the Beat
Melbourne Marathon
Great Ocean Road Marathon

Strongman
World's Strongest Man

Surfing
Australian Open of Surfing
U.S. Open of Surfing

Tennis
Bank of the West Classic
BNP Paribas Tennis Classic
Miami Open
Apia International Sydney
Barcelona Open Banc Sabadell
Madrid Open

Triathlon
Escape from Alcatraz
London Triathlon
San Diego Triathlon

Volleyball
FIVB Volleyball Men's Nations League
FIVB Volleyball Women's Nations League

IMG College

In late 2007, IMG acquired Host Communications and the Collegiate Licensing Company to form IMG College.  In 2010 IMG acquired ISP Sports, which was based in Winston-Salem, North Carolina.  Today, IMG represents the multimedia rights for more than 90 universities, conferences, collegiate associations and venues along with the licensing rights to more than 150 colleges and universities as well as the College Football Playoff. Additionally, IMG Seating serves more than 100 universities, and IMG Learfield Ticket Solutions provides outsourced ticketing services to 30 universities nationwide.

IMG Fashion
Australian Fashion Week
Berlin Fashion Week
New York Fashion Week
Miami Swim Week, formerly called Mercedes-Benz Fashion Week Miami
World MasterCard Fashion Week
Mercedes-Benz Fashion Week Russia

IMG Licensing
Licensing Division works in trademark licensing and currently provides its services to more than 100 Licensors of intellectual property (corporate trademarks, Institutions and non-profits, Automotive companies, Fashion, Lifestyle, Entertainment and Events, Athletes, Legends and personalities).

IMG eSports
SK Gaming
Cloud9
Team Dignitas
Fortitude NA
Kabum eSports
Tyler Angi
Ryan Newbatt

In April 2022, the Global Esports Federation (GEF) announced IMG as their strategic partners and as a result the Commonwealth Esports Championship was formed.

IMG Tennis
 Novak Djokovic 
 Naomi Osaka 
 Gaël Monfils 
 Li Na 
 Kei Nishikori 
 Maria Sharapova 
 Jo-Wilfried Tsonga 
 Venus Williams 
 Serena Williams 
 Petra Kvitová 
 Marta Kostyuk
  Garbiñe Muguruza 
 Nick Kyrgios 
 Madison Keys 
  Laura Robson
 Sara Errani
 Carlos Moya 
 David Ferrer 
  Monica Seles 
 John McEnroe 
 Anastasia Pavlyuchenkova 
 Sabine Lisicki
 Agnieszka Radwańska
 Kevin Anderson
 Jack Sock 
 Vasek Pospisil
 Iga Świątek

Television channels

Sport 24

Sport 24 is a 24/7 live sports television channel owned by IMG Media, which is available on international airlines such as Lufthansa, Alitalia, Hong Kong Airlines, Garuda Indonesia, All Nippon Airways, Emirates, Etihad Airways, Qatar Airways, Turkish Airlines, American Airlines, WestJet, and AeroMéxico, as well in international waters on cruise lines including Carnival. 

Among the leagues, tours, and events that have been covered by the service are Premier League, National Football League, National Basketball Association, UEFA Champions League, ATP World Tour, PGA Tour, European Tour, Euroleague and European Rugby Champions Cup, UEFA Euro 2020, 2020 Summer Olympics and Ryder Cup. As there is limited competition for these rights in international airspace and international waters, IMG has been able to consolidate these rights onto a single service.

Sport 24 launched in February 2012. A secondary part-time channel, Sport 24 Extra, launched in 2016, offering an extra 150 live hours a month and choice during concurrent events. Both channels originate from IMG’s production headquarters at Stockley Park, near London’s Heathrow Airport.  Sport 24 is available on Panasonic’s live television service, which is broadcast via satellite to airlines.

EDGEsport
EDGEsport is an international sports and lifestyle television channel owned by IMG Media, broadcasting a variety of action and extreme combat sports, and adventure sports programming. It is available in over 20 countries across the Europe, Middle East, the United States (via Xumo) and Asia Pacific.

On February 1, 2018, the Philippine version of the channel (later renamed as TAP Edge in February 2020) was launched via Sky Cable, and it was the first channel owned by TAP Digital Media Ventures Corporation (TAP DMV), EDGEsport programming was ended on TAP Edge in December 2020, as the channel transition its format to action/drama-oriented general entertainment channel.

See also
IMG Academy
IMG Models
Longhorn Network – a TV network (of which IMG College is a partner) that specifically covers athletics and events at the University of Texas at Austin
Sports agent – a listing of well-known sports agents, categorized by sport

References

External links
BFI - Trans World International

Companies established in 1960
1960 establishments in Ohio
Sports management companies
Sports event promotion companies
Entertainment companies of the United States
Privately held companies of the United States
Companies based in Cleveland
Silver Lake (investment firm) companies
2013 mergers and acquisitions
Modeling agencies